Amit Elor (born January 1, 2004) is an American freestyle wrestler and brazilian jiu-jitsu practitioner. She competes at 72 kilograms in amateur wrestling. She is a senior, junior and cadet world champion.

Background
Elor was born in California, U.S. She has Russian roots. Amit was a skilled judoka at a young age, representing the United States in the female INTL Intermediate division at +43kg in 2013, aged nine. Amit started wrestling at the age of ten.

Wrestling career

Folkstyle 
Elor has trained in wrestling almost her whole life. During her years of high school, Elor won multiple high school tournaments.

Freestyle 
After meeting Soviet coach Valentin Kalika, Elor started training in freestyle wrestling, where she has outstanding achievements at cadet and junior levels. She won the junior world's twice in Ufa, Russia and Sofia, Bulgaria. In September 2022, Amit became the youngest World Champion in American wrestling history after winning the world title in Belgrade, Serbia at 18 years old. She defeated Zhamila Bakbergenova of Kazakhstan in her gold medal match. A month later, she won the gold medal in the 72kg event at the 2022 U23 World Wrestling Championships held in Pontevedra, Spain.

She competed at the World Cup 2022, it was her second senior tournament and as a team member she finished in 4th.

Championships and achievements
Amateur wrestling:
2019 Cadet World Wrestling Championships – 3rd (69 kg)
2021 Cadet World Wrestling Championships – 1st (69 kg)
2021 Junior World Wrestling Championships – 1st (68 kg)
2022 Junior World Wrestling Championships – 1st (72 kg)
2022 Zouhaier Sghaier Ranking Series – 8th (72 kg)
2022 Senior World Wrestling Championships – 1st (72 kg)
2022 U23 World Wrestling Championships – 1st (72 kg)
2022 World Cup – 4th (72 kg)
Brazilian Jiu-Jitsu:
Purple belt
2021 BJJBET Grand Prix – 1st (68 kg)

Freestyle record

! colspan="7"| Senior Freestyle International matches
|-
! Res.
! Record
! Opponent
! Score
! Date
! Event
! Location
|-
! style=background:white colspan=7 |
|-
|Win
|21–1
|align=left| Qiandegenchagan Qiandegenchagan
|style="font-size:88%"|5–0
|style="font-size:88%" rowspan=1|December 10–11, 2022
|style="font-size:88%" rowspan=1|World Cup
|style="text-align:left;font-size:88%;" rowspan=1|
 Coralville, US
|-
! style=background:white colspan=7 |
|-
|Win
|20–1
|align=left| Wiktoria Chołuj
|style="font-size:88%"|TF 11–0
|style="font-size:88%" rowspan=3|October 20–21, 2022
|style="font-size:88%" rowspan=3|U23 World Championships
|style="text-align:left;font-size:88%;" rowspan=3|
 Pontevedra, Spain
|-
|Win
|19–1
|align=left| Larisa Nițu
|style="font-size:88%"|4F–0
|-
|Win
|18–1
|align=left| Kendra Dacher
|style="font-size:88%"|13F–2
|-
! style=background:white colspan=7 |
|-
|Win
|17–1
|align=left| Zhamila Bakbergenova
|style="font-size:88%"|10–0
|style="font-size:88%" rowspan=4|September 14–15, 2022
|style="font-size:88%" rowspan=4|Senior World Championships
|style="text-align:left;font-size:88%;" rowspan=4|
 Belgrade, Serbia
|-
|Win
|16–1
|align=left| Masako Furuichi
|style="font-size:88%"|3–2
|-
|Win
|15–1
|align=left| Buse Tosun
|style="font-size:88%"|4F–0
|-
|Win
|14–1
|align=left| Anastasiya Alpyeyeva
|style="font-size:88%"|TF 10–0
|-
! style=background:white colspan=7 |
|-
|Win
|13–1
|align=left| Anastassiya Panassovich
|style="font-size:88%"|TF 10–0
|style="font-size:88%" rowspan=4|August 15–21, 2022
|style="font-size:88%" rowspan=4|Junior World Championships
|style="text-align:left;font-size:88%;" rowspan=4|
 Sofia, Bulgaria
|-
|Win
|12–1
|align=left| Reetika Reetika
|style="font-size:88%"|TF 12–1
|-
|Win
|11–1
|align=left| Zsófia Virág
|style="font-size:88%"|TF 10–0
|-
|Win
|10–1
|align=left| Zaineb Sghaier
|style="font-size:88%"|Fall
|-
! style=background:white colspan=7 |
|-
|
|9–1
|align=left| Zaineb Sghaier
|style="font-size:88%"|Forfeit
|style="font-size:88%" rowspan=2|July 14–17, 2022
|style="font-size:88%" rowspan=2|Zouhaier Sghaier
|style="text-align:left;font-size:88%;" rowspan=2|
 Tunis, Tunisia
|-
|
|9–1
|align=left| Bipasha Bipasha
|style="font-size:88%"|Forfeit
|-
! style=background:white colspan=7 |
|-
|Win
|9–1
|align=left| Elizaveta Petliakova
|style="font-size:88%"|TF 10–0
|style="font-size:88%" rowspan=3|August 16–22, 2021
|style="font-size:88%" rowspan=3|2021 Junior World Championships
|style="text-align:left;font-size:88%;" rowspan=3|
 Ufa, Russia
|-
|Win
|8–1
|align=left| Molnar Zsuzsanna
|style="font-size:88%"|TF 11–0
|-
|Win
|7–1
|align=left| Arju Arju
|style="font-size:88%"|TF 10–0
|-
! style=background:white colspan=7 |
|-
|Win
|6–1
|align=left| Yevhenii Siedykh
|style="font-size:88%"|Fall
|style="font-size:88%" rowspan=3|July 19–25, 2021
|style="font-size:88%" rowspan=3|2021 Cadet World Championships
|style="text-align:left;font-size:88%;" rowspan=3|
 Budapest, Hungary
|-
|Win
|5–1
|align=left| Viktoryia Radzkova
|style="font-size:88%"|Fall
|-
|Win
|4–1
|align=left| Barbara Abigel Sere
|style="font-size:88%"|TF 10–0
|-
! style=background:white colspan=7 |
|-
|Win
|3–1
|align=left| Zaineb Sghaier
|style="font-size:88%"|TF 12–0
|style="font-size:88%" rowspan=4|July 29–4, 2019
|style="font-size:88%" rowspan=4|2019 Cadet World Championships
|style="text-align:left;font-size:88%;" rowspan=4|
 Sofia, Bulgaria
|-
|Loss
|2–1
|align=left| Honoka Naka
|style="font-size:88%"|1–3
|-
|Win
|2–0
|align=left| Lili Újfalvi
|style="font-size:88%"|TF 10–0
|-
|Win
|1–0
|align=left| Karolina Povk
|style="font-size:88%"|TF 12–0
|-

Personal life
Amit is a dog lover and likes to cook.

She dates Brazilian Jiu-Jitsu world champion Micael Galvâo

References 

American female sport wrestlers
2004 births
Living people
Sportspeople from Walnut Creek, California
Sportspeople from California
21st-century American women